{{DISPLAYTITLE:Hesperidin 6-O-alpha-L-rhamnosyl-beta-D-glucosidase}}

Hesperidin 6-O-alpha--rhamnosyl-beta--glucosidase is an enzyme with systematic name hesperetin 7-(6-O-alpha--rhamnopyranosyl-beta--glucopyranoside) 6-O-alpha-rhamnopyranosyl-beta-glucohydrolase. This enzyme catalyses the following chemical reaction

 hesperidin + H2O  hesperetin + rutinose

The enzyme exhibits high specificity towards 7-O-linked flavonoid beta-rutinosides.

The enzyme is produced by the fungus Acremonium sp. DSM24697. The genera Acremonium and morphologically similar Stilbella have not yet been fully studied on a molecular basis. Under the morphological basis, the fungus Stilbella fimetaria SES201 was reidentified as Acremonium sp. SES201 = DSM24697.

References

External links 
 

EC 3.2.1